Eukaryotic translation initiation factor 1A, Y-chromosomal is a protein that in humans is encoded by the EIF1AY gene.

Like its X-chromosomal counterpart EIF1AX, it encodes an isoform of eukaryotic translation initiation factor 1A (EIF1A). EIF1A is required for the binding of the 43S complex (a 40S subunit, eIF2/GTP/Met-tRNAi and eIF3) to the 5' end of capped RNA. It has one amino acid difference (M50L) from EIF1AX.

References

Further reading